U.S. Route 62 (US 62) is part of the U.S. Highway System. US 62 travels from the United States–Mexico border at El Paso, Texas, to Niagara Falls, New York. In the U.S. state of New Mexico, US 62 extends from the Texas state line southwest of Whites City and ends at the Texas state line east of Hobbs.

Route description
 
Through New Mexico, US 62 is entirely concurrent with US 180. The highway continues past Carlsbad Caverns National Park and White's City into the city of Carlsbad. US 62 comes within  of the WIPP Plant while also coming across several State Highway termini: New Mexico State Road 360 (NM 360), NM 176, NM 243, NM 529, NM 483, NM 360, and NM 8 along the  stretch. US 62 comes into Hobbs along Marland Boulevard. After coming close to Hobbs High School's Watson Stadium, US 62 leaves Hobbs going east to the Texas–New Mexico state line.

Major intersections

References

Transportation in Eddy County, New Mexico
Transportation in Lea County, New Mexico
 New Mexico
62